The 2021–22 Monmouth Hawks men's basketball team represented Monmouth University in the 2021–22 NCAA Division I men's basketball season. The Hawks, led by 11th-year head coach King Rice, played their home games at OceanFirst Bank Center in West Long Branch, New Jersey as members of the Metro Atlantic Athletic Conference.

The 2021–22 season would be the program's last season in the MAAC, as the Hawks joined the CAA in 2022–23.

Previous season
The Hawks finished the 2020–21 season 12–8, 12–6 in MAAC play to finish as MAAC regular season co-champions, alongside Siena. As the No. 2 seed in the MAAC tournament, they were upset in the  quarterfinals by No. 7 seed Fairfield.

Roster

Schedule and results

|-
!colspan=12 style=""| Regular season

|-
!colspan=9 style=""| MAAC tournament

Source

References

Monmouth Hawks men's basketball seasons
Monmouth Hawks
Monmouth Hawks men's basketball
Monmouth Hawks men's basketball